Bojan Knežević may refer to:

 Bojan Knežević (Serbian footballer) (born 1989), Serbian football goalkeeper
 Bojan Knežević (Croatian footballer) (born 1997), Croatian football forward